Eva Louise Buus (born 1979) is a Danish artist. A graduate of the Royal Danish Academy of Fine Arts, she has exhibited in Denmark, Germany and Greenland. Her landscapes are principally concerned with the effects of light and darkness on the appearance of her images. In 2015, she exhibited works in Fanø Museum which she had created by subjecting plates of copper to the effects of various acids, inspired by the landscapes of the Swedish painter Carl Johan Forsberg. More recently her metallic works have drawn on his recently rediscovered watercolours of women.

Biography
While a student at the Royal Academy, Buus was awarded the 2008 Caspar David Friedrich Prize in Greifswald, northern Germany which led to a solo exhibition "Expanding Nature" there the following year. Her first major solo exhibition in Denmark was "Colour me Blind" (2011) at the Galleri Christina Wilson in Copenhagen. Her works exploited the juxtaposition of colours, apparently revealing tones that were not really present. Details only became evident as the observer moved around in front of each of her images.

In 2012, Buus exhibited works at a solo exhibition titled Hvide Nætter (White Nights) at the Maniitsog Museum in western Greenland with support from the Danish Arts Council. While she had previously worked mainly with "light", her landscapes now also covered "darkness" as an important component of life in Greenland. The works on display responded to the intensity of the light in the room. When the lighting was dim, they revealed surprising detail and colour while in bright light, only outlines could be seen. At the end of the year, in collaboration with Krista Rosenkilde, she participated in the "Light - Heavy" exhibition at the Gentofte Central Library north of Copenhagen in which her "light" paintings stood in sharp contrast to Rosenkilde's three-dimensional forms.

In 2013, Buus exhibited at the Caspar-David-Friedrich-Zentrum in Greifswald, explaining her works were painted with a greatly reduced colour palette. This caused the almost complete disappearance of the  contrasts and colours, leaving images that were virtually monochrome. "Although the motifs are detailed and figuratively formed, they first remain latent until the eyes become accustomed to the contrasts in the colouring. Only then do the motifs begin to emerge," she commented.

In March 2015 at Fanø Kunstmuseum, Buus exhibited a series of images on metal plates crafted by applying various acids. The motifs were inspired by the works of the Swedish artist Carl-Johan Forsberg who painted scenes on the island of Fanø. She explained she had fallen in love with Forsberg's works when she first saw his painting "Sønderho Havn ved nat" (Sønderho Harbour at Night) which she has reinterpreted applying her new approach.

Another exhibition involving Buus's interpretations of Forsberg attracted hundreds to the Rønnebæksholm culture centre near Næstved for a vernissage on 19 September 2016. Buus has continued to develop her interest in the Swedish painter, especially after she discovered watercolours of both attractive and rather ugly, corpulent women in the archives of Fanø Museum. The exhibition now presents Forsberg's originals side by side with Buus's evolving metallic interpretations of the women he painted with an eye for beauty. The exhibition, bringing attention not only to Forsberg but above all to Buus, is scheduled to continue until 18 December.

Other interests
In addition to her paintings, Buus also exhibited her "Go Baby Glow" elephant in the 2011 Copenhagen Elephant Parade. Turning to ceramics, in 2014, she designed plates for Royal Copenhagen which were presented as awards for the winners of the Årets Ret (Dish of the Year) competition in September 2014.

Exhibitions
Buus's works have been presented at numerous solo exhibitions. These include:
2006, Opposites, Private Bag Gallery, Lusaka, Zambia
2006, Summer, Østfynsk Kunstforening, Nyborg, Denmark
2008, Hvide Dimensioner (White Dimensions), Q, Copenhagen
2009, Expanding Nature, Pomeranian State Museum, Greifswald, Germany
2009, Currents in Time, with Anna Örtemo, Æglageret, Holbæk
2011, Colour me Blind, Galleri Christina Wilson, Copenhagen
2011, Nattebilleder (Night Paintings), Projekt:Rum, Copenhagen
2012, Hvide Nætter (White Nights), Maniitsoq Museum, Greenland
2013, Heavy><Light, Traneudstillingen, Copenhagen
2013, Expanding Color, Caspar-David-Friedrich-Galerie, Greifswald
2015, Slægtskab (Kinship): Eva Louise Buus interprets Forsberg's work, Fanø Kunstmuseum
2016, Forestillinger om Skønhed (Notions of Beauty): Carl Johan Forsberg & Eva Louise Buus, Rønnebæksholm

She has also participated in the following group exhibitions:

2003, OPEC, The Royal Danish Academy of Fine Arts, Copenhagen
2003, This is what the Taxpayers pay for, Rådmandskælderen, Copenhagen, 
2003, Charlottenborg Spring Exhibition, Copenhagen
2004, Kunstnernes Efterårsudstilling (Autumn Exhibition), Den Frie Udstilling, Copenhagen
2004, Filosofa: Vejle, Espergærde, Gilleleje
2004, Back Room, Galleri Egelund, Copenhagen
2004, Byens Lys (City Lights), Christiania, Copenhagen, DK
2004, Ung Kunst (Young Art), Inkonst, Malmö, Sweden and Frederiks Bastion, Copenhagen
2004, E.L.B, Kommunernes Landsforening, Copenhagen
2004, Mix, St. Kongensgade 68, Copenhagen
2004, Charlottenborg Spring Exhibition, Copenhagen
2005, Den 8., Førstetilvenstre, København
2005, Pro-Art, Randers Museum of Art, Randers
2005, Folosofa, Center for Eksperimenterende Kunst, Børkop
2006, Paperbang, Galleri Fung Sway, Copenhagen
2006, Back to the Future, Galleri Rebecca Kormind, Copenhagen
2006, Passionsdage (Passion Days), Lauritz.com, Øksnehallen, Copenhagen
2006, Summer Show, Galleri Rebecca Kormind, Copenhagen
2006, Charlottenborg Spring Exhibition], Copenhagen
2007, Girls Going North, Galleri Himmelhav, Frederikshavn
2007, Thisted Biennale, Thisted
2008, Wonderful Copenhagen, Copenhagen
2009, Exit 09, Kunstforeningen, Copenhagen
2009, Juleudstilling (Christmas Show), Galleri Krydder, Sogndal, Norway
2010, X-Tra Light, Galleri Kant, Esbjerg
2010, PT10 – Påskeudstillingen 2010, West Jutland Art Museum, Tistrup
2012, Konstens Landskap, Tjörnedala Konsthall/ÖSKG, Sweden

References

External links
Eva Louise Buus's website

Bibliography

1979 births
21st-century Danish painters
21st-century Danish ceramists
Women
Danish women painters
Artists from Copenhagen
Living people
Royal Danish Academy of Fine Arts alumni
20th-century Danish women artists
20th-century Danish artists
21st-century Danish women artists
21st-century ceramists
Danish women ceramists